Go Un-ho (born 26 August 1978) is a South Korean swimmer. He competed in four events at the 1996 Summer Olympics.

References

External links
 

1978 births
Living people
South Korean male freestyle swimmers
Olympic swimmers of South Korea
Swimmers at the 1996 Summer Olympics
Place of birth missing (living people)
Swimmers at the 1998 Asian Games
Swimmers at the 2002 Asian Games
Asian Games medalists in swimming
Asian Games bronze medalists for South Korea
Medalists at the 1998 Asian Games
Medalists at the 2002 Asian Games
21st-century South Korean people